This is a list of statistics for the 1975 Cricket World Cup.

Team statistics

Highest team totals
The following table lists the ten highest team scores during this tournament.

Batting statistics

Most runs
The top ten highest run scorers (total runs) in the tournament are included in this table.

Highest scores
This table contains the top five highest scores of the tournament made by a batsman in a single innings.

Highest partnerships
The following tables are lists of the highest partnerships for the tournament.

Bowling statistics

Most wickets
The following table contains the five leading wicket-takers of the tournament.

Best bowling figures
This table lists the top five players with the best bowling figures in the tournament.

Fielding statistics

Most dismissals
This is a list of the wicketkeepers who have made the most dismissals in the tournament.

Most catches
This is a list of the outfielders who have taken the most catches in the tournament.

References

External links

 Cricket World Cup 1975 Stats from Cricinfo

statistics
Cricket World Cup statistics